"Always Have Always Will" is a 1998 song by Swedish pop band Ace of Base. Heavily inspired by the Motown sound of the mid-1960s, the intro samples the intros from the Supremes track "Where Did Our Love Go" and the Four Tops track "I Can't Help Myself (Sugar Pie Honey Bunch)". It was co-written by Jonas Berggren with Mike Chapman. The song was originally titled "Killer on the Rampage" and contained different lyrics. When the song was pitched as a potential song for the upcoming Flowers/Cruel Summer album, Arista records liked the melody; however, requested that the lyrics be rewritten.

The song was released from their third album, Flowers (1998), in many parts of the world, but at different times.

UK on 7 December 1998 as single three, following "Life Is a Flower" and "Cruel Summer".
Australia in early 1999 as the second single, following "Cruel Summer"
Scandinavia & Germany on 1 March 1999 as single four, following "Life Is a Flower", "Cruel Summer", and "Travel to Romantis".

Critical reception
Swedish newspaper Aftonbladet wrote that the song "ties ecstatic summery serpentines between classic girl-pop and glittery seventies disco". Quentin Harrison of Albumism described it as "classic Motown", adding that Ace of Base "showcase their expertise at branching out." AllMusic editor Bryan Buss called it a "'50s throwback". Chuck Campbell from The Daily News wrote that it "bask in an affable warmth never before divulged by the cold Swedes." An editor from Expressen commented that it "begins as" Supremes "Baby Love", "then lets go of the Motown-bass and becomes a 90s version" of Chip's Melodifestival song "Dag efter dag". Gary Shipes from The Stuart News noted that the "faux Motown bounce" of the "teen-idol homage" "Donnie" and "Always Have, Always Will", "with their sterling sawing strings and crystalline melodies, are begging to be blasting out of car radios everywhere."

Music video
The accompanying music video for the song was directed by the band members themselves. It used footage from recording sessions, concerts and appearances of the band all across the world.

Track listings

 EU CD single
"Always Have, Always Will" – 3:47
"Mercy Mercy" – 3:38

 UK CD single
"Always Have, Always Will"  3:47
"Love for Sale" – 3:37
"Whenever You're Near Me" – 3:32

 UK CD single 2
"Always Have, Always Will" – 3:47
"Mercy Mercy" – 3:38
"Living in Danger" (D-House mix – short version) – 4:04

 Australian and German CD maxi  
 Always Have Always Will – 3:47
 Mercy Mercy – 3:38
 Living in Danger (D-House mix – short version) – 4:04
 Love for Sale – 3:37

 Scandinavian CD maxi  
 Always Have Always Will – 3:47
 Captain Nemo – 4:01
 Love for Sale – 3:37

 CD promo
 Always Have Always Will – 3:47

"Love for Sale"
"Love For Sale" is an Ace of Base B-side from their third European album Flowers.

It was included in the maxi single of "Always Have Always Will" from 1998 in Australia, Sweden and later in the UK. Originally planned to be in the final track list of the Flowers album, it is a dance song written by Jonas Berggren and sung by Jenny and Malin Berggren about prostitutes' life in the city.

Charts

Sales
UK: 163,717

Release history

Cover versions
Swedish dansband Friends recorded a cover version on the 1999 on the album Friends på turné.

References

1998 singles
1998 songs
Ace of Base songs
English-language Swedish songs
Mega Records singles
Number-one singles in Denmark
Songs written by Jonas Berggren
Songs written by Mike Chapman